Neil Ritchie (21 October 1933 – 7 December 2017) was a New Zealand cyclist. He competed in the team pursuit event at the 1956 Summer Olympics.

Ritchie died in Auckland on 7 December 2017.

References

External links
 

1933 births
2017 deaths
New Zealand male cyclists
Olympic cyclists of New Zealand
Cyclists at the 1954 British Empire and Commonwealth Games
Cyclists at the 1956 Summer Olympics
Cyclists from Auckland
Commonwealth Games competitors for New Zealand
20th-century New Zealand people